The World Figure Skating Championships is an annual figure skating competition sanctioned by the International Skating Union in which figure skaters compete for the title of World Champion.

The 1950 championships took place on March 6 to 8 in Wembley, United Kingdom.

Results

Men

 Referee: Dr. James Koch 
 Assistant Referee: Gustavus F. C. Witt 

Judges:
 Fritz Kachler 
 Mr. Norman V. S. Gregory 
 Mr. H. Meistrup 
 Capt. Henry Graham Sharp 
 Mr. Elemér Terták 
 Dr. A. Huber 
 Harold G. Storke

Ladies
*: better placed due to the majority of the better placings

 Referee: Major Kenneth M. Beaumont 
 Assistant Referee: Gustavus F. C. Witt 

Judges:
 Mr. A. Voordeckers 
 Mr. Norman V. S. Gregory 
 Dr. J. Hainz 
 Mr. H. Meistrup 
 Georges Torchon 
 Major Geoffrey S. Yates 
 Harold G. Storke

Pairs
*: better placed due to the majority of the better placings

 Referee: Walter S. Powell 

Judges:
 Mr. Fritz Kachler 
 Mr. A. Voordeckers 
 Mr. Norman V. S. Gregory 
 Mr. H. Meistrup 
 Georges Torchon 
 Cap. Ernest H. C. Yates 
 Mr. Elemér Terták 
 Dr. A. Huber 
 Harold G. Storke

Ice Dance (unofficial)

References

Sources
 Result List provided by the ISU

World Figure Skating Championships
World Figure Skating Championships, 1950
World Figure Skating Championships
World Figure Skating Championships, 1950
International sports competitions in London
International figure skating competitions hosted by the United Kingdom
World Figure Skating Championships